This is a list of public art in the London Borough of Hillingdon.


Eastcote

Harefield

Harmondsworth

Hayes

Art installation
On Sunday 5 August 2012, Jeremy Deller's art installation Sacrilege (an inflatable life-size model of Stonehenge) was installed in Barra Hall Park from 10.30am to 6pm. An estimated 1,400 people visited on the day.

Heathrow Airport

Northwood

Ruislip

Uxbridge

West Drayton

References

External links
 

Articles containing video clips
Hillingdon
Hillingdon
Tourist attractions in the London Borough of Hillingdon